This is a list of mushroom-forming fungi genera in the order Agaricales.

Genera

See also
List of Agaricales families

References

Notes

References

 
Agaricales
Agaricales